Baissour or Bayssour, is a village located in the Aley District of Mount Lebanon.

Baissour River (Naher Baissour, نهر بيصور) is home to many restaurants and resorts. Thousands of tourists visit Baissour every year, and along with the restaurants along the river, one of the biggest attractions is the Radar area.  This beautiful, mountainous, tree covered picnic and recreational area is located at the highest point of Baissour and is accessible year round.

History
In 1838, Eli Smith noted  the place, called Beisur, located in  Aklim es-Sahhar, between el-Ghurb and el-Jurd.

See also
Jamil Molaeb
Ghazi Aridi
 Druze in Lebanon

References

Bibliography

External links
 Bayssour, Localiban

Populated places in Aley District
Druze communities in Lebanon